The Nashville Sounds Minor League Baseball team has played in Nashville, Tennessee, since being established in 1978 as an expansion team of the Double-A Southern League. They moved up to Triple-A in 1985 as members of the American Association before joining the Pacific Coast League in 1998. With the restructuring of the minor leagues in 2021, they were placed in the Triple-A East, which became the International League in 2022. The team has been led by 29 managers throughout its history. Managers are responsible for team strategy and leadership on and off the field, including determining the batting order, arranging defensive positioning, and making tactical decisions regarding pitching changes, pinch-hitting, pinch-running, and defensive replacements. Rick Sweet has been the Sounds' manager since 2021.

As of the completion of the 2022 season, Nashville's managers have led the club for 6,272 regular-season games in which they have compiled a win–loss record of 3,237–3,035. In 16 postseason appearances, their teams have a record of 49–44 and have won two Southern League championships and one Pacific Coast League championship. Combining all 6,365 regular-season and postseason games, the Sounds have an all-time record of 3,286–3,079.

Five managers have been selected as their league's Manager of the Year. Stump Merrill (1980) won the Southern League Manager of the Year Award. Rick Renick (1993 and 1996) won the American Association Manager of the Year Award. Frank Kremblas (2007) and Steve Scarsone (2016) won the Pacific Coast League Manager of the Year Award. Rick Sweet (2022) won the International League Manager of the Year Award. Mike Guerrero (2013) and Rick Sweet (2022) won the  Mike Coolbaugh Award in recognition for their contributions in developing and mentoring young players in the Milwaukee Brewers organization. Three managers have been selected for midseason All-Star teams. George Scherger coached the 1979 Southern League All-Star team. Two others participated in the Triple-A All-Star Game. Pete Mackanin coached on the National League team in 1991, and Rick Renick managed the American League team in 1994.

Trent Jewett won 320 games from 1998 to 2000 and 2003 to 2004, placing him first on the all-time wins list for Sounds managers. Having managed the team for 625 games over five seasons, he is also the longest-tenured manager in team history. The manager with the highest winning percentage over a full season or more is Stump Merrill (1980–1981), with .622. Conversely, the lowest winning percentage over a season or more is .437 by manager Mike Guerrero (2012–2013).

History

Playing in the Southern League as the Double-A affiliate of the Cincinnati Reds, the Nashville Sounds were managed by Chuck Goggin in their inaugural 1978 season. Goggin had managed the Reds' previous Double-A team, the Trois-Rivières Aigles, in 1977. He was replaced in 1979 by George Scherger, a veteran manager of 18 minor league seasons. He was chosen as a coach for the 1979 Southern League All-Star team and led Nashville to win their first Southern League championship that year.

The Sounds became the Double-A affiliate of the New York Yankees in 1980. Stump Merrill, who had been with New York's Double-A West Haven Yankees the previous two seasons, led Nashville in the first two years of the new partnership. He was selected for the Southern League Manager of the Year Award in 1980 after the Sounds set a franchise-best 97–46 win–loss record. Merrill's .622 winning percentage from 1980 to 1981 is the highest among all Sounds managers over a full season or more. First-year manager Johnny Oates took over in 1982 and led the club to its second Southern League championship. Doug Holmquist was promoted to Nashville from the Yankees' Class A Greensboro Hornets in 1983. He was succeeded in 1984 by former Major League Baseball (MLB) manager and 1952 Nashville Vol Jim Marshall.

The Sounds moved to the Triple-A American Association in 1985 as an affiliate of the Detroit Tigers. Lee Walls was assigned to manage the team, but he was hospitalized with internal bleeding after seven games. Outfielder Leon Roberts became the acting manager for the next seven games until being replaced by Gordon Mackenzie, who was promoted from the Tigers' Double-A Birmingham Barons. Roberts retired from playing at the end of the season and was hired to manage the 1986 club.

Nashville switched its affiliation to the Cincinnati Reds in 1987. Jack Lind, previously manager of the Reds' Triple-A Denver Zephyrs, led the team from 1987 through the first three months of the 1988 season. From June to July 1988, the Sounds went through five different managers. Lind was fired on June 27. Pitching coach and former Sounds starting pitcher Wayne Garland served as a fill-in manager for one game. Jim Hoff, Cincinnati's minor league field coordinator, managed the next five games on an interim basis. Former manager George Scherger was brought in on July 3, but he chose to retire after one game. Garland managed two more games before Hoff returned for seventeen games. Finally, former big league skipper Frank Lucchesi was hired on July 25 to manage the Sounds for the last 39 games of the season. He remained with the team for the 1989 campaign. Pete Mackanin was hired to lead Nashville in 1990. He was selected to coach the National League team in the 1991 Triple-A All-Star Game. Mackanin was dismissed on June 28, 1992. Dave Miley, manager of Cincinnati's Double-A Chattanooga Lookouts, was promoted to take his place for the rest of the season.

The Sounds became the Triple-A affiliate of the Chicago White Sox in 1993. Rick Renick, who had managed Chicago's Triple-A Vancouver Canadians for two years prior, continued in that role at Nashville from 1993 to 1996. Renick won the American Association Manager of the Year Award in 1993 and 1996, and he was chosen to manage the American League team at the 1994 Triple-A All-Star Game. He was succeeded by White Sox minor league outfield coordinator Tom Spencer in 1997.

Nashville moved to the Triple-A Pacific Coast League (PCL) in 1998 following the disbandment of the American Association after the 1997 season. As an affiliate of the Pittsburgh Pirates, the Sounds were managed by Trent Jewett, who had spent the last two seasons with their previous Triple-A club, the Calgary Cannons. He remained with Nashville until being named Pittsburgh's third base coach on June 6, 2000. Sounds pitching coach Richie Hebner was made the manager for the rest of the season. Marty Brown, a former Sounds third baseman from 1988 to 1989, was manager in 2001 and 2002 after two years leading Pittsburgh's Double-A Altoona Curve. Jewett returned to manage at Nashville from 2003 to 2004. Over both stretches from 1998 to 2000 and 2003 to 2004, Jewett won 320 games, placing him first on the all-time wins list for Sounds managers. Having managed the team for 625 games over five seasons, he is also the longest-tenured manager in team history.

The Sounds became the Triple-A affiliate of the Milwaukee Brewers in 2005. Frank Kremblas was given the helm at Nashville after managing Milwaukee's Double-A Huntsville Stars for three years. He led the Sounds to win the Pacific Coast League championship in the first season of the affiliation. Kremblas was chosen as the PCL Manager of the Year in 2007 and remained with the club through 2008. Four-time MLB All-Star Don Money, who had replaced Kremblas in Huntsville in 2005, led the Sounds from 2009 to 2011. Mike Guerrero was promoted to Nashville in 2012 after two years at Huntsville. He missed nine games of the 2013 season on bereavement leave. Charlie Greene, the Brewers' field coordinator and catching instructor, served as interim manager during that time. Guerrero returned to finish out the year, after which he won the Mike Coolbaugh Award in recognition for his contributions in developing and mentoring young players in the Brewers organization. His .437 winning percentage is the lowest among all Sounds managers over a full season or more. Rick Sweet, a roving catching instructor for Cincinnati and veteran manager of 24 minor league seasons, led the team in 2014.

Nashville switched its affiliation to the Oakland Athletics in 2015. Steve Scarsone managed the Sounds in 2015 and 2016 after two seasons in the same capacity with the Athletics' former Triple-A club, the Sacramento River Cats. He won the PCL Manager of the Year Award in 2016. Scarsone was succeed in 2017 by Ryan Christenson, who had spent the two previous seasons with Oakland's Double-A Midland RockHounds. Fran Riordan was promoted from Midland to Nashville for 2018.

The Sounds affiliated with the Texas Rangers in 2019. Jason Wood, who had been with the Rangers' Triple-A Round Rock Express for the last four seasons, continued in the same role with Nashville. Wood had also played for the Sounds from 2000 to 2001 at third base and shortstop. First-year manager Darwin Barney was hired to manage in 2020, but the season was cancelled due to the COVID-19 pandemic before it began.

In conjunction with Major League Baseball's restructuring of Minor League Baseball in 2021, the Sounds reaffiliated with the Milwaukee Brewers and were placed in the new Triple-A East. Rick Sweet, who led the team in the final season of their previous term with Milwaukee, continued to manage the Brewers' Triple-A clubs in the six years between affiliations and returned to lead Nashville in 2021. In 2022, the Triple-A East became known as the International League. Sweet won the 2022 International League Manager of the Year Award and the 2022 Mike Coolbaugh Award..

Managers

See also
List of Nashville Sounds coaches

Notes

References
Specific

General

Managers